Demirkapı is a village in the İkizdere District, Rize Province, in Black Sea Region of Turkey. Its population is 191 (2021).

Geography

References

Villages in İkizdere District